Ajay Rohera (born 4 June 1997) is an Indian cricketer. He made his List A debut for Madhya Pradesh in the 2018–19 Vijay Hazare Trophy on 19 September 2018. He made his first-class debut for Madhya Pradesh in the 2018–19 Ranji Trophy on 6 December 2018. He scored 267 not out, and broke the record for highest score on debut in a first-class innings. He broke the record of Amol Muzumdar who scored 260 against Haryana in the 1993–1994 season.

References

External links
 

1997 births
Living people
Indian cricketers
Madhya Pradesh cricketers
Place of birth missing (living people)
Wicket-keepers